Varabad or Warabad may refer to:

Varabad, Markazi
Varabad, Tehran